Nowosielec may refer to the following places in Poland:
Nowosielec, Podkarpackie Voivodeship (south-eastern Poland)
Nowosielec, Masovian Voivodeship (east-central Poland)